Sandow is a German and Jewish (western Ashkenazic) family name. It is a variant of Sandau, which is a habitational name from a place near Stendal called Sandau. The Swedish barers of the name are probably of German origin. It may refer to:

 Surname

 Alan Sandow (born 28 February 1952), Australian drummer member of rock band Sherbet
 Billy Sandow (1884–1972), American professional wrestler and promoter
 Chris Sandow (born 1989) Australian professional rugby league player
 Christian Sandow (born 1959), German modern pentathlete
 Damien Sandow (born 1981), American professional wrestler
 Eugen Sandow (1867–1925), born Friedrich Wilhelm Müller, German bodybuilder
 Greg Sandow (born 1943), American music critic and composer
 P. K. Raja Sandow (1894–1943), born as P. K. Nagalingam, Tamil film actor

 Given name or nickname

 Sandow Birk, American visual artist 
 Sandow Nasution (born 1981), Indonesian weightlifter
 Dan "Sandow" O'Donovan (1890–1975), member of the Irish Republican Army
 Sandy Ruby (1941–2008), born Sandow Sacks Ruby, American mathematician and entrepreneur
 Sandow M. M. A. Chinnappa Thevar, Tamil film producer

 Other

 Sandow (film), an 1894 silent film featuring Eugen Sandow
 Sandow (apple), an apple cultivar
 Sandow's Magazine of Physical Culture, a bodybuilding magazine established by Eugen Sandow in 1898
 Mount Sandow, a nunatak near Mount Amundsen in Antarctica
 Sandow Lakes Ranch, a ranch in Texas, USA.
 Sandow Power Plant, a coal-fired power plant near Rockdale, Texas
 Sandow, Chiktan, a village in Jammu and Kashmir state of India

See also
 Rockdale, Sandow and Southern Railroad
 Sandoz (disambiguation)

Jewish surnames